Xiuma Township (Mandarin: 秀麻乡) is a township under the jurisdiction of Tongde County, Hainan Tibetan Autonomous Prefecture, Qinghai, China. In 2010, Xiuma Township had a total population of 7,286: 3,710 males and 3,576 females: 2,203 aged under 14, 4,728 aged between 15 and 65 and 355 over 65 years of age.

References 

Tongde County
Township-level divisions of Qinghai